Striate keratodermas are a group of autosomal dominant palmoplantar keratodermas with streaking hyperkeratosis involving the fingers and extending onto the palm of the hand.

See also
 Keratoderma
 Skin lesion

References

 

Papulosquamous hyperkeratotic cutaneous conditions